Emanuele Della Rosa (born 21 February 1980 in Rome) is an Italian professional boxer, who has fought at light middleweight.

Former challenger for the WBC Middleweight Title (2009) and for the EBU Title (2013/2014).

Is currently trained by Valerio Monti.

Professional Record
Professional record consists of 35 bouts: 33(9 ko) win and only 2 losses

Titles Held
WBC International Light Middleweight Title (2010/2011/2012)
IBF International Welterweight Title (2006)
WBC Mediterranean Welterweight Title (2007)
challenger for the WBC Middleweight Title (2009)
challenger for the EBU Light Middleweight Title (2013)

References

External links

Emanuele Della Rosa on Wikipedia Italy

1980 births
Living people
Italian male boxers
Light-middleweight boxers